Ellen Burstyn is an American actress of the stage and screen.

Burstyn has received what's known as the Triple Crown of Acting winning the Emmy Award, Academy Award, and Tony Award. She has received six Oscar nominations winning the Academy Award for Best Actress for her leading role in Martin Scorsese's Alice Doesn't Live Here Anymore (1974). She was also nominated for her roles in Peter Bogdanovich's The Last Picture Show (1971), William Friedkin's The Exorcist (1973), and Darren Arronofsky's Requiem for a Dream (2000). She also received the British Academy Film Award for Best Actress for Alice Doesn't Live Here Anymore. She has been nominated for 7 Golden Globe Awards winning Best Actress – Motion Picture Comedy or Musical for Same Time, Next Year (1976).

For her work in television she has received eight Primetime Emmy Awards nominations winning twice for Outstanding Guest Actress in a Drama Series for Law and Order: SVU in 2009 and Outstanding Supporting Actress in a Limited or Anthology Series or Movie for Political Animals in 2013. For her work on the Broadway stage she received the Tony Award for Best Actress in a Play for Same Time, Next Year in 1975. She also received a nomination for the Grammy Award for Best Spoken Word Album in 1996.

Triple Crown of Acting

Academy Awards

Emmy Awards

Tony Award

Major associations

British Academy Film Awards

Golden Globe Awards

Grammy Awards

Independent Spirit Awards

Screen Actors Guild Award

Critics Awards

Alliance of Women Film Journalists

Boston Society of Film Critics

Chicago Film Critics Association

Critics' Choice Awards

Chlotrudis Society for Independent Film Awards

Dallas–Fort Worth Film Critics Association Awards

Denver Film Critics Society Awards

DiscussingFilm Critics Awards

Florida Film Critics Circle

Greater Western New York Film Critics

Houston Film Critics Society

London Film Critics Circle

National Society of Film Critics

New York Film Critics Circle

New York Film Critics Online

Online Film Critics Society

San Diego Film Critics Society

St. Louis Film Critics Association

Toronto Film Critics Association

Vancouver Film Critics Circle

Miscellaneous Awards

AARP Movies for Grownups Awards

Awards Circuit Community Awards

Behind the Voice Actors Awards

Berlin International Film Festival

Boston Film Festival

CinEuphoria Awards

Canadian Screen Awards

Fangoria Chainsaw Awards

Gold Derby Awards

Saturn Awards

Satellite Award

References 

Lists of awards received by American actor